The Southwest Academic Conference (SWAC) was a quiz bowl conference in Southwest Virginia that was discontinued in 2012.

It began with meetings between the Superintendents of schools in  Smyth County, Washington County, and Bristol in December 1986 to propose the formation of a league to allow students to participate in academic competitions.  This idea was presented to the principals of the schools in the Spring of 1987 and the name Southwest Academic Conference (SWAC) was chosen.

The schools involved were Abingdon High School, John S. Battle High School, Chilhowie High School, Holston High School,  Marion Senior High School, Northwood High School, Patrick Henry High School, Virginia High School.

Competition
The schools have teams for the content areas of English, Mathematics, Science, Social Studies.  The English team has an approved reading list each season focusing on selected plays, novels, short stories, nonfiction, and poetry as well as specific terminology.  The Math team focuses on studies from Algebra I, Algebra II, Geometry, and Trigonometry.  The science team focuses on the studies of physical science, earth science, biology, and chemistry.  The social studies questions involve treaties, US Supreme Court cases, legislation, geography, and history.  In addition to the content area specific teams, there is an All-Around team which focuses on information regarding art and architecture, performing arts (dance, theater, music), philosophy, religion, world literature (including mythology), math (including the history of math), science (physical science, earth science, biology, chemistry, psychology), and social studies (US history and world history, sociology, anthropology.
Schools generally compete twice per week on Monday and Thursday with four schools hosting the competitions and four schools traveling to the school against which they are competing.  For 2008, the order of competition is social studies, all around, English, math, science.

The teams compete with four players each.  The first round in all areas but math has 10 directed questions for each team where the emcee asks each team a question and allows them to answer, however if the team misses the other team gets an opportunity to answer the question.  The math team's directed round has 10 directed questions and both teams are allowed to answer by writing the answer on a piece of paper which the emcee collects at the end of the time allowed to answer.  All categories have a second round made up of ten toss-up questions where players from either team may ring in to answer.  If a player rings in before the emcee says "Begin" and answers incorrectly, there is a 2-point penalty and the question is read in its entirety for the other school.  Each correct answer in both rounds is worth five points.

Championships
English:
 2009: Chilhowie High
 2008: Holston High
 2007: Holston High
 2006: Northwood High
 2005: Patrick Henry High
 2004: Northwood High
 2003: Patrick Henry High
 2002: Holston High
 2001: John S. Battle High

Math:
 2009: Abingdon High
 2008: Abingdon High
 2007: Virginia High
 2006: Virginia High
 2005: Virginia High
 2004: Marion High
 2003: Marion High
 2002: Marion High
 2001: Marion High
 2000: Abingdon High
 1999: Abingdon High
 1998: Abingdon High
 1997: Abingdon High
 1996: Abingdon High

Science:
 2009: Virginia High
 2008: Marion High
 2007: Abingdon High
 2006: Virginia High
 2005: Abingdon High
 2004: Virginia High
 2003: Virginia High
 2002: Abingdon High
 2001: Marion High

Social Studies:
 2009: Abingdon High
 2008: Patrick Henry High
 2007: Patrick Henry High
 2006: Northwood High
 2005: Northwood High
 2004: Northwood High
 2003: Northwood High
 2002: Abingdon High
 2001: Virginia High

All Around:
 2009: Marion High
 2008: Holston High
 2007: Holston High
 2006: Northwood High
 2005: Marion High
 2004: Marion High
 2003: Marion High
 2002: Marion High
 2001: Abingdon High

External links
 official website

References

Education in Virginia
Bristol, Virginia
Smyth County, Virginia
Washington County, Virginia